The 1919 Gonzaga Blue and White football team was an American football team that represented the Gonzaga University as an independent during the 1919 college football season. In their first year under head coach William S. Higgins, the team compiled a 2–3 record.

Schedule

References

Gonzaga
Gonzaga Bulldogs football seasons
Gonzaga Blue and White football